Great Marlow School Boat Club (GMSBC) is a rowing club on the River Thames, based at Longridge Activity Centre boathouse, Quarry Wood Road, Marlow, Buckinghamshire.

History
The club was reformed in 2008 following several lottery grants. The club belongs to Great Marlow School and shares the boathouse facility with Sir William Borlase's Grammar School Boat Club.

The club has produced several British champions.

Honours

British champions

See also
Rowing on the River Thames

References

Sport in Buckinghamshire
Rowing clubs in England
Rowing clubs of the River Thames
Scholastic rowing in the United Kingdom